Foremost means first. Foremost may also refer to:
Bow (ship), the front of a ship
Foremost, a manufacturer in Canada of equipment for oil & gas, mining, construction and waterwell markets etc
Foremost 105, originally named Empire Greta, a tugboat in the service of the British Government from 1945 to 1947
Foremost 106, originally named Empire Martha, a tugboat in the service of the British Government from 1945 to 1947
Foremost Airport, an airport outside of Foremost, Alberta
Foremost, Alberta, a village in Canada
Foremost Formation, a geological formation in Alberta
Foremost Group, a New York-based shipping company
Foremost Insurance, a mobile home and recreational vehicle insurance company, part of Farmers Insurance Group
Foremost-McKesson, a name previously used by the McKesson Corporation
Foremost (software), a forensic data recovery program